Gorovoye is a rural locality (a selo) in Krasnogvardeysky District, Belgorod Oblast, Russia. The population was 352 as of 2010. There is 1 street.

Geography 
Gorovoye is located 16 km southwest of Biryuch (the district's administrative centre) by road. Novokhutornoye is the nearest rural locality.

References 

Rural localities in Krasnogvardeysky District, Belgorod Oblast